Peltoschema festiva is a species of leaf beetle in the family Chrysomelidae. It is found in Australia.

References 

Chrysomelinae
Beetles described in 1877